SQL Developer may refer to:

 Oracle SQL Developer, a free SQL IDE from Oracle Corporation
 PL/SQL Developer, an IDE for PL/SQL development from Allround Automations 
 SOLYP SQL Developer, a generic proprietary database-tool written by Jan Borchers